The ALS Association is an American nonprofit organization that funds global amyotrophic lateral sclerosis (ALS) research, provides care services and programs to people affected by ALS through its nationwide network of chapters, and works with ALS advocates around the country for state and federal policies that serve people living with amyotrophic lateral sclerosis (ALS), also known as Lou Gehrig's disease. The ALS Association is broken up into distinct chapters, each servicing a particular geographic area of the United States and all working under the umbrella of a national charter and administrator.

Research
The ALS Association has partnerships with Sean M. Healey & AMG Center for ALS at Massachusetts General Hospital, ALS Finding a Cure, and the Muscular Dystrophy Association. Additionally, the organization is a research partner for Answer ALS (started by Steve Gleason), Target ALS (founded by Dan Doctoroff), and ALS ONE. The organization also provides funding for the ALS Research Forum, a project of Prize4Life, which has since merged with the ALS Association.

Because of the awareness and funding from the Ice Bucket Challenge, the Association committed nearly $90 million in research funding between 2014 and 2018, a 187% increase in its annual research funding. This included $81.2 million across 275 research grants in the U.S. and $8.5 million internationally. The research led to the discovery of five new genes connected to ALS:
 NEK1 - mutations of this gene contribute to both sporadic and familial cases of ALS
 KIF5A - the KIF5A protein functions within neurons to transport materials up and down the axon, a nerve fibre that carries information to muscle cells and is also called the cytoskeleton; the ALS mutation truncates the protein near its end so that the full protein is not made
 C21orf2
 TUBA4A - mutations in this gene destabilize the microtubule network and diminish its repolymerization capability; this is another cytoskeleton defect, like KIF5A
 TBK1

According to Hemali Phatnani, director of the Center for Genomics of Neurodegenerative Disease at the New York Genome Center, funds raised from the Challenge led to the creation of one of the largest resources of ALS whole genome-sequencing data, which has been shared with partners around the world.

In September 2020, the New England Journal of Medicine reported that a new drug combination, AMX0035, was safe and effective at slowing the progression of ALS in a clinically meaningful way. The ALS Association had provided early financial support for research into AMX0035 with Ice Bucket Challenge donations. After the clinical trial outcomes were published, The ALS Association launched a petition asking Amylyx Pharmaceuticals and the Food and Drug Administration to work together to make the drug available to people with ALS as quickly as possible.

Public policy
After four years of efforts by thousands of people affected by ALS to cultivate significant bipartisan support, the ALS Disability Access Act of 2019 was signed into law in December 2020. This bill eliminates the arbitrary five-month waiting period formerly required before people living with ALS could draw on their Social Security Disability Insurance benefits.

Care services 
As of 2020, there are 39 ALS Association chapters across the U.S., serving people with ALS in all 50 States. The chapters include services such as patient referrals to Certified Centers of Excellence or Recognized Centers (of affiliated clinics) and coordination of volunteers to provide support and respite to caregivers.

The Ice Bucket Challenge 
In the summer of 2014, the Ice Bucket Challenge raised $220 million after going viral on social media. The ALS Association received $115 million of that amount. To participate, individuals were challenged to pour a bucket of ice water over themselves and/or donate money to ALS research and care. Individuals such as former President George W. Bush, Bill Gates, Taylor Swift, Benedict Cumberbatch, LeBron James, and Martha Stewart dumped ice water on their heads to raise money to fight ALS. In total, about 17 million people uploaded videos of themselves doing the challenge, and the videos were viewed more than 10 billion times.

From the challenge, $115 million was raised, and the Association increased the number of patients served by 28%. Most of the donations were used for research, but there were other uses. For example, local chapters purchased equipment (power wheelchairs, walkers, shower benches, etc.) for ALS patients and were able to provide for everyone on their respective wait-lists.

The Association's clinical network also expanded by 50% as a result of the funding from the Challenge. A study by RTI International reported 29 new ALS Certified Treatment Centers of Excellence, 20 new Recognized Treatment Centers, and 7 new affiliated clinics. Also according to RTI, the National Institutes of Health (NIH) has invested nearly $416 million in ALS Association-funded researchers since the Challenge.

Following the 2014 Ice Bucket Challenge, the ALS Association attempted to trademark the term "ice bucket challenge". Following backlash, the association withdrew the trademark application. In early 2018, a patient group called the "Terminally Persistent" coalition criticized the ALS Association for not spending the $115 million earned from the Ice Bucket Challenge more readily on research. Additionally, the group complained that the organization was not providing funding to BrainStorm Cell Therapeutics, a pharmaceutical company researching treatments for ALS and running Phase III clinical trials; the ALS Association does not fund Phase III clinical trials.

Awareness and fundraising
The association's signature fundraising event each year is the "Walk to Defeat ALS". This event is held each fall through spring by local chapters of the association in cities across the United States. Since its inception in 2000, this event has raised more than $265 million.

References

External links 
 

Medical and health organizations based in Washington, D.C.
Neurology organizations
Patient advocacy
Organizations established in 1985
ALS Association
Non-profit organizations based in Washington, D.C.
1985 establishments in the United States